Jirair or Jirayr is an Armenian masculine given name that may refer to

 Jirair Hovnanian (1927–2007), American home builder
 Jirair Sefilian (born 1967), Lebanese-born Armenian military commander and political activist
 Jirair Ananian, Armenian playwright
 Jirayr Zorthian, Armenian American artist
 Jirayr Ohanyan Çakır, chess player, coach, and former president of the Turkish Chess Federation
 Gerard Jirayr Svazlian, Armenian violinist
 Zhirayr Margaryan (born 1997), Armenian football player

Armenian masculine given names